Mornington Crescent is a London Underground station in Somers Town in north west London, named after the nearby street. It is in Travelcard Zone 2.

The station was opened as part of the original route of the Charing Cross, Euston & Hampstead Railway (now the Charing Cross branch of the Northern line) on 22 June 1907. The surface building was designed by the Underground Electric Railways Company of London's (UERL's) architect Leslie Green in the Modern Style (British Art Nouveau style). Prior to the station's opening, the name of "Seymour Street" had been proposed.  After opening, it was little used. For many years it was open only on weekdays, and before 1966 Edgware-bound trains passed through without stopping.

Location
The station is situated at the southern end of Camden High Street, where it meets Hampstead Road and Eversholt Street. This junction forms the north-western corner of the boundary of Somers Town, with Camden Town situated to the north and Regent's Park Estate to the south of the station.

The station's location on the Northern line is unusual due to the dual-branch nature of that line. The City branch also runs from Camden Town to Euston, but via tunnels which take an entirely different route to the Charing Cross branch and which do not pass through Mornington Crescent. Although modern-day tube maps show Mornington Crescent to the west of the City branch tunnels, it is actually to the east of them: the two branches cross over each other at Euston, so that between Euston and Camden Town, the City branch tunnels run to the west of the Charing Cross branch on which Mornington Crescent is situated. Harry Beck's 1933 tube map represented this correctly.

Closure and reopening
On 23 October 1992 the station was shut so that the then 85-year-old lifts could be replaced. The intention was to open it within one year. However, due to lack of funding and the state of neglect, the station remained closed for 6 years.

A concerted campaign to reopen the station was launched, with pressure from Camden Council, and assistance from the popular BBC Radio 4 panel game I'm Sorry I Haven't a Clue. The show frequently features the game Mornington Crescent, which takes its name from the station.

During the station's rebuilding, the original distinctive light blue tiling pattern was restored to the station (though taking into account modern fire safety requirements). The ticket hall was reconstructed and the original emergency stairs closed. A second lift shaft was converted (losing the unnecessary extra two lifts) into a staircase on one side and a series of station facilities on the other.

After substantial refurbishment, the station was reopened on 27 April 1998 by the regular cast of I'm Sorry I Haven't a Clue (Humphrey Lyttelton, Barry Cryer, Tim Brooke-Taylor and Graeme Garden). A memorial plaque to the late Willie Rushton, one of the longest-serving panelists, was installed at the station in 2002.

Since its 1998 reopening, the station has been open at the same times as most other stations, including weekends, in an attempt to relieve the pressure on the increasingly busy nearby  station.

In popular culture

In film
 The station was used as a location for the anthology film Tube Tales (1999).
It was portrayed in the film Honest (2000), although the station actually used was Aldwych.
 In Allt flyter (2008), Sara meets her mother (who has moved there from Sweden for a sportscasting job) outside the station during a Christmas trip to London.

In radio
 Mornington Crescent is a spoof game, featured since the 1970s in the BBC Radio 4 comedy panel show I'm Sorry I Haven't a Clue, which satirises complicated strategy games. A Comic Heritage blue plaque honouring Willie Rushton, one of the show's longest-serving panelists, was installed within the station in 2002. It is located behind the ticket barrier at the top of the stairs to the platform.

In literature
 China Miéville mentions this station and its long state of disuse during the 1990s in his novel King Rat (1998), also using it as scene of a brutal murder by dismemberment via a passing train.
 In The Atrocity Archives (2004) by Charles Stross, the secret main entrance to the extremely secret Government establishment (the "Laundry") which the protagonist Bob Howard works for is situated in the gentlemen's toilets of Mornington Crescent tube station.
 In Christopher Fowler's "Bryant & May" mysteries, the offices of the Peculiar Crimes Unit are above Mornington Crescent tube station.
 Mornington Crescent is used by Robert Rankin in many of his novels as the home of the Ministry of Serendipity, a fictional agency whose main activity is to ensure the British Empire rules the globe, the top secret nature of the ministry being the main reason why the station was only open on weekdays and closed for "repairs" for much of the 1990s.

In music
 Belle & Sebastian released a song entitled "Mornington Crescent" on their 2006 album, The Life Pursuit.
 My Life Story's 1995 album Mornington Crescent takes its name from the station, featuring photos in its sleeve notes.
 The promotional video for "Be There" by Unkle was filmed in this station.

Connections
London Buses routes 24, 27, 29, 46, 134, 168, 214, 253 and 274 and night routes N5, N20, N28, N29, N31, N253 and N279 serve the station.

Gallery

See also
 Mornington Crescent (street), the 1820s terrace after which the tube station is named

References

External links

 London Transport Museum Photographic Archive
 
 
 

Northern line stations
Tube stations in the London Borough of Camden
Former Charing Cross, Euston and Hampstead Railway stations
Railway stations in Great Britain opened in 1907
Camden Town
Leslie Green railway stations
London Underground Night Tube stations